The 2011 Nigerian Senate election in Sokoto State was held on April 9, 2011, to elect members of the Nigerian Senate to represent Sokoto State. Abdullahi Ibrahim Gobir representing Sokoto East, Ahmed Muhammad Maccido representing Sokoto North and Umaru Dahiru representing Sokoto South all won on the platform of Peoples Democratic Party.

Overview

Summary

Results

Sokoto East 
Peoples Democratic Party candidate Abdullahi Ibrahim Gobir won the election, defeating other party candidates.

Sokoto North 
Peoples Democratic Party candidate Ahmed Muhammad Maccido won the election, defeating other party candidates.

Sokoto South 
Peoples Democratic Party candidate Umaru Dahiru won the election, defeating party candidates.

References 

Sokoto State Senate elections
Sokoto State senatorial elections
Sokoto State senatorial elections